The 1st Air and Air Defence Forces Command was a command of the Russian Air Force from 2009-2015. It was located at Voronezh and supervised air force operations in the Western Military District. It was created on 1 December 2009. 

On 1 August 2015, it was reorganized as the 6th Air and Air Defence Forces Army.

It comprised the:
1st Air-Space Defense Brigade (Severomorsk)
 2nd Air-Space Defense Brigade (St. Petersburg)
 6961st Aviation Base (Petrozavodsk Airport) (Su-27)
 6964th Aviation Base (Monchegorsk, Murmansk Oblast) (Su-24M, Su-24MP)
 6965th Aviation Base (Viaz’ma, Smolensk Oblast) (Mi-8, Mi-24)
 7000th Aviation Base (Voronezh) (Su-24M, Su-24MP, Su-34)

References

Units and formations of the Russian Air Force
Military units and formations awarded the Order of the Red Banner
Military units and formations disestablished in 2015